Badreddine Benachour (born 2 July 1994) is a Moroccan footballer currently playing for Ittihad Tanger as a goalkeeper.

Honours
Individual
Toulon Tournament Best Goalkeeper: 2015

References

External links

1994 births
Living people
Footballers from Casablanca
Moroccan footballers
Wydad AC players
SCC Mohammédia players
Al-Kawkab FC players
Ittihad Tanger players
Botola players
Saudi First Division League players
Association football goalkeepers
Moroccan expatriate footballers
Expatriate footballers in Saudi Arabia
Moroccan expatriate sportspeople in Saudi Arabia